The 1995 Speedway Grand Prix of Sweden was the fourth race of the 1995 Speedway Grand Prix season. It took place on 12 August in the Motorstadium in Linköping, Sweden.

Starting positions draw 

The Speedway Grand Prix Commission nominated Peter Karlsson as Wild Card.

Heat details

The intermediate classification

See also 
 Speedway Grand Prix
 List of Speedway Grand Prix riders

References

External links 
 FIM-live.com
 SpeedwayWorld.tv

Speedway Grand Prix of Sweden
S
1995